Rocquemont may refer to the following places in France:

 Rocquemont, Oise, a commune in the Oise department
 Rocquemont, Seine-Maritime, a commune in the Seine-Maritime department